Ambathurai is a Village in Dindigul district  in the state of Tamil Nadu, India. The latitude 10.2725047 and longitude 77.9244456 are the geo-coordinates of Ambathurai. Chennai is the state capital for Ambathurai village. It is located around 406.1 kilometer away from Ambathurai. The other nearest state capital from Ambathurai is Thiruvananthapuram and its distance is 214.2 km. The other surrounding state capitals are Pondichery (278.6 km). and Bangalore (303.3 km).

Demographics 

As of the 2011 Census of India, Ambathurai had a population of 9,166. Males constitute 49.74% of the population and females 50.25%. Ambathurai has an average literacy rate of 66.75%, higher than the national average. The village is primarily focused on agriculture. Recently non-farming job opportunities and businesses have been started by the population.

Economy 
Ambathurai is a clean and neat village known for its location surrounded by Hills in both the East and West side. It is also a comfortable residential area in Dindigul district. Ambathurai's economy depends on a mixed set of occupations like farming, daily wagers, government service staff and non-farming businesses.

Railway Station 
There is a railway station in Ambathurai village. It is becoming a busy railway station due to its proximity to the town Chinnalapatti. There are 3-4 Broad Gauge railway tracks in the station and it supports Electric Trains too. Few important Express trains and local passenger trains are stopping in the station. Notable ones is the Pandian Super fast Express that runs between Chennai and Madurai.

Nearest Railway station is in Dindigul which is just located 10 kms away.

Police Station 
The entrance of the Village Ambathurai starts with a police station. Cops are available 24/7 with regular sentry changes. They do frequently check for vehicles driven without proper documentation and quickly act during emergencies like accidents, thefts etc. One can contact the police station by dialing 0451-2452286.

Transportation 
Ambathurai Village is situated on the National Highway 7 (NH7) which connects Madurai with Dindigul.  It has well connected bus facility and trains availability. Town buses operated by Government and Private sectors serve the need of this emerging town. The mofussil buses flying in NH-7 also serves the need. Madurai Airport is the nearest airport for this village (approximately 65 km).

Education

Schools Nearby 
 St. Josephs Primary School - 1.5 km.
 Rc Sagayarani Middle School - 0.8 km.
 Thambithottam Higher Secondary School - 1.5 km.
 Victory Matriculation School - 2.7 km.

Universities Nearby 
 Gandhigram Rural Institute

References

External links 
 Railway Station at Ambathurai

Villages in Dindigul district